Wabasca 166A is an Indian reserve of the Bigstone Cree Nation in Alberta, located within the Municipal District of Opportunity No. 17. In the 2016 Canadian Census, it recorded a population of 658 living in 183 of its 213 total private dwellings.

References

Indian reserves in Alberta